Takeru, also known as Sur Dé Wave, was a Japanese video game developer.

The announcement of the name Sur Dé Wave appeared in the 1991-05 issue of micomBASIC magazine.

History 
Takeru published Cocoron, developed by K2 in 1991. The game was directed by Akira Kitamura, who had previously directed Mega Man 1 and 2.

Takeru developed Little Samson, which was published by Taito. 

Takeru's 1991 adventure game Nostalgia 1907 sold poorly, and financially hurt the company.

A port of Cocoron to the PC-Engine, titled PC Cocoron was announced, however, it was unreleased.

As Sur dé Wave they also released a Game Boy car adapter power cable and a game controller by the name of Mega Blaster.

References 

Video game companies of Japan